Tunny may refer to:

 Tuna
 Tunny cipher

Ships
 Either of the United States submarines which has been called USS Tunny

Fiction
 A character in the musical American Idiot
 The name of a fictional family in the horror film Wicked Little Things

See also

 Tonny (disambiguation)
 Tunney (disambiguation)